Sarnakunk is a village in the Gorayk Municipality of the Syunik Province in Armenia.

Toponymy 
The village was previously known as Saybalu.

Demographics

Population 
The Statistical Committee of Armenia reported its population was 519 in 2010, up from 514 at the 2001 census.

References 

Populated places in Syunik Province